"In Walked Love" is a song by the American girl group Exposé. Written by Diane Warren and produced by Steve Thompson and Michael Barbiero, the song can be found on the group's 1992 album Exposé, their third studio album. Lead vocals on the pop ballad were performed by Ann Curless. The song features Al Pitrelli as guest guitarist. In 1996, British singer Louise covered the song and reached number 17 on the UK Singles Chart with her rendition.

Reception
Released as the fourth and final single from the album Exposé, "In Walked Love" entered the Billboard Hot 100 chart in April 1994, peaking at number 84. It fared better on the Billboard adult contemporary chart, where it reached number 17. To date, this is the last Exposé single to reach either chart, although their single "I'll Say Good-Bye for the Two of Us" (from the soundtrack to the film Free Willy 2) "bubbled under" the Hot 100 in 1995.

Charts

Louise version

British singer Louise covered "In Walked Love" and released it as the second single from her first album, Naked (1996), on March 4, 1996. Her version reached number 17 on the UK Singles Chart.

Critical reception
A reviewer from Music Week gave Louise's version of the song three out of five, adding, Continuing to build profile, the former Eternal singer's voice sounds even stronger on this chartbound love ballad." Mark Sutherland from NME described it as "straightforwardly danceable".

Track listings
UK CD1 and Australasian CD single
 "In Walked Love"
 "In Walked Love" (Uno Clio vocal mix)
 "In Walked Love" (Dancing Divas vocal mix)
 "In Walked Love" (Dancing Divas dub mix)

UK CD2 and cassette single
 "In Walked Love"
 "All of You"
 "Real Love" (Tin Tin Out remix)
 "In Walked Love" (Uno Clio dub mix)

Charts

References

1992 songs
1994 singles
1996 singles
Arista Records singles
EMI Records singles
Exposé (group) songs
First Avenue Records singles
Louise Redknapp songs
Pop ballads
Songs written by Diane Warren